The 1940 Montrose Burghs by-election was held on 5 July 1940.  The by-election was held due to the elevation to the peerage of the incumbent Liberal National MP, Charles Kerr.  It was won by the unopposed Liberal National candidate John Maclay.  Due to the war time electoral truce, the Labour and Liberal parties did not put up any candidates.

References

1940 elections in the United Kingdom
1940 in Scotland
1940s elections in Scotland
July 1940 events
Politics of Angus, Scotland
By-elections to the Parliament of the United Kingdom in Scottish constituencies
Unopposed by-elections to the Parliament of the United Kingdom (need citation)